Mahdasht (also romanized as Māhdāsht; also known as Mardabad (Persian: مَرد آباد), also Romanized as Mardābād) is one of the five cities in the Central District of Karaj County, Alborz province, Iran. At the 2006 census, its population was 43,100 in 10,760 households. The latest census in 2016 counted 62,910 people in 19,147 households.

Notable people 
Baito Abbaspour is a bodybuilder.

Majid Khodabandelou is a retired footballer who previously played in the top three divisions of the Iranian football league system.

References 

Karaj County

Cities in Alborz Province

Populated places in Alborz Province

Populated places in Karaj County